Oswego Municipal Airport  is a city-owned public-use airport located in Cherokee County, Kansas, three miles (5 km) east of the central business district of Oswego, a city in Labette County, Kansas, United States.

Facilities and aircraft 
Oswego Municipal Airport contains one runway: 17/35 with a  asphalt pavement.

For the 12-month period ending December 31, 2010, the airport had 600 aircraft operations, an average of 50 per month: 70% local general aviation and 30% transient general aviation. At that time there were 3 aircraft based at this airport: 100% single-engine.

Future Expansion
The City of Oswego is currently planning to construct a new runway with dimensions 3,200 ft x 60 ft. Fuel services and new hangars, as well as repairs to the current runway, are being studied.

A new access road is being constructed to the airport from U.S. Highway 160. It was expected to be completed by the spring of 2011.

The airport's proximity to the Joplin, Missouri area provides an opportunity for increased expansion into the corporate aviation and general aviation areas.

References

External links

Airports in Kansas
Buildings and structures in Cherokee County, Kansas